KRGX 95.1 FM is a radio station licensed to Rio Grande City, Texas.  The station broadcasts a Regional Mexican format and is owned by 95.1 Investments, LLC.

References

External links

RGX
Radio stations established in 2009
2009 establishments in Texas
Regional Mexican radio stations in the United States